Doctor Who is a British science fiction television programme produced by the BBC. The show has been a large influence in the media since its inception in 1963. Running parallel to its parenting seasons and series' lie miscellaneous television broadcasts, home video "exclusive" releases, web broadcasts, video games, scenes released to promote something, theatrical films and live lesson broadcasts.

Supplementary stories
There have been several special Doctor Who episodes and serials that are produced by the BBC. They usually consist of minisodes, crossovers with other TV shows, and stories produced for special occasions.

Alternative versions of stories
Over the series' run existing stories have often been adapted with new effects, animation or scenes – something that is common practise since the DVD releases. These are alternative version of pre-existing stories. Some even remade and re-edited.

Theatrical stories

Home video-exclusive stories

Animated serials

Online-exclusive mini-episodes 
Many Doctor Who mini-episodes exist as a one-off broadcast or release and to be a prelude to an existing story made not for charity or promotional purposes.

Prequels  
Throughout the sixth and seventh series beginning with "The Impossible Astronaut", several prequels were released online, which acted as openers for their accompanying episodes. All "prequels" were released ahead of their accompanying episodes, with the exception of "Battle of Demons Run – Two Days Later" which was released after "The Snowmen". The concept is similar to that of the second series, in which each episode had an accompanying Tardisode. In August 2013, a prequel to "Deep Breath" was shown in cinemas prior to the debut of the episode. Two prequels to the ninth series premiere, "The Magician's Apprentice", were released in September 2015.

Segments of other broadcasts

Segments of other series
Many Doctor Who specials were aired during another series –  for example 'A Fix with Sontarans' and 'Dermot and the Doctor'. This list only includes official appearances.

{{Episode table |background=#BE81F7|title=30 |aux1=20 |director=15 |writer=15 |airdate=20 |aux1T=Episodes |released=y|episodes=
{{Episode List 
 |Title           = Get Off My Cloud
 |RTitle          = <small>(from Out of the Unknown)</small>
 |Aux1            = 1 episode, 50 minutes
 |DirectedBy      = Peter Cregeen
 |WrittenBy       = David Climie 
 |OriginalAirDate = 
 |ShortSummary    = Crossover with Doctor Who and Out of the Unknown. The then-current TARDIS prop appears as well as Peter Hawkins reprising his role as voice of the Daleks. The episode is missing from the BBC archives with only a brief audio clip surviving.
 |LineColor       = BE81F7
}}

}}

Charity specials
Many special stories have been produced for charity telethons specifically Children in Need and Comic Relief.

 Promotional mini-episodes and scenes 
Sometimes, instead of a trailer, a mini-episode or scene will be made to promote a release. This is common practise by Big Finish Productions and the BBC blu-ray The Collection range which features a new mini-episode with every release. Sometimes a narrative trailer in the style of a special scene is released (e.g. Campfire).

 In-character factual stories 
Many productions have been made that are "in-universe" documentaries. Usually events from an episode told from the perspective of a fictional character from the series. These were made to promote the outgoing series at the time of broadcast.

 Big Finish screen stories 

Interactive and educational stories

Live performances pre-filmed segments

See also

 Doctor Who''
 List of Doctor Who serials
 List of Doctor Who missing episodes
 List of unmade Doctor Who serials
 List of Doctor Who audio releases
 List of Doctor Who radio stories

References

External links
 Doctor Who Reference Guide – detailed descriptions of all televised episodes, plus spin-off audio, video, and literary works.

Doctor Who serials
Doctor Who series
Serials
Doctor Who